The Uptown Theater in Philadelphia, Pennsylvania, also known as Uptown Theater and Office Building, is an Art Deco building built in 1927. It was designed by the Philadelphia-based architectural firm of Magaziner, Eberhard & Harris. The Uptown Theater is located on 2240 N. Broad Street. It became a major venue on the Chitlin' Circuit, from 1951–1978. It was listed on the National Register of Historic Places in 1982.

It briefly reopened as a church in the 1980s until water damage occurred and caused it to close in 1991. In 2001, the Uptown Entertainment and Development Corporation bought the building with plans for renovation.

Beginnings
Opened on February 16, 1929, the 2,040 seat, 50,000 square foot Uptown Theater was built for sound, specifically the new talkies of the time, made by Warner Brothers. Designed by Louis Magaziner, it featured a lavish interior, with four floors of office space above. The interior consisted of stained glass, high ceilings, and terracotta. As the industrial age peaked in America, North Philadelphia became a working man's town. A large influx of European immigrants moved to the northern part of the city, and moved into the newly developed rowhomes.

In addition to the new immigrants, North Philadelphia also became the home to many fashionable mansions of the upper and upper-middle class. Executives from nearby factories lived in Victorian brownstones, some with turrets and mansard roofs, which lined the streets of North Philly. Along Broad Street were the grand mansions of many industrialists. Lower North Philadelphia in particular housed a number the nouveau riche; ambitious first or second generation immigrants or that had made their fortunes starting manufacturing firms.

The theater was originally built for the nouveau riche of the area. Unknowingly, it opened up on the eve of the Great Depression, which in turn had a great effect on the neighborhood. Over the next few decades The Great Depression, outsourcing, and white flight took their toll on North Philadelphia in a fashion similar to other major US cities of the mid to late 20th century, if not in a more pronounced fashion. While some small areas had long housed primarily African-American residents, redlining, racist loan companies, and rising unemployment led white residents out of the city, and forced blacks in. Black doctors, lawyers, politicians and preachers took over the grand mansions along Diamond Street, while middle and lower class blacks moved into the rowhomes that were once predominately white.

The Golden Years

In 1951 the Uptown Theatre was bought by Sam Stiefel, who also owned Washington's Howard Theatre and Baltimore's Royal Theatre, and became part of the "chitlin circuit," hosting live music shows that were primarily rhythm and blues, soul, and gospel directed towards an African American audience. The performances at the Uptown Theater came to rival those at Harlem's Apollo Theater. In 1957, Georgie Woods of WDAS (AM) fame started to produce shows at the Uptown Theater. In 1960, Sid Booker became the manager of the theater, and remained so until 1979. In 1961, the venue was sold by Mrs. Bert Steifel to a large chain corporation, after managing it for only two months following the death of the Steifel brothers, who owned it for many years

Performances
Many different types of shows went on at the venue during its prime. Usually, each show consisted of multiple artists, usually ten to twelve acts, and they performed in order of popularity. There were several performances a day, and the show usually lasted for about ten days. The first show of the day started at 2pm. The midnight performances of the show cost $2.50, while the earlier shows cost $1.50, and the kiddie matinees cost 50 cents a person. In its early years patrons could arrive on the Broad Street Subway and enter through the theatre's own subway platform.

On Thursday nights, the theater used to have Temple University night, in which many white students would come in and watch performances. Many patrons of the theater would hide in places such as the bathroom to see additional shows in one day. The shows themselves were very competitive in nature, with each act trying to get the biggest rise out of the crowd. Performers and audience members alike dressed up when attending shows at the theater. Performers also tried to impress each other with wowing the crowd with the best dance moves as well. Artists were not often booked for a lot of money. Georgie Woods was able to book the Supremes for $400 for a full 10-day run.

Not only did musicians perform at the Uptown Theater, but comedians such as Redd Foxx and Flip Wilson used to open for the acts. The venue itself was unique in that it had its own house band. Bill Masse was band leader of the band until he died in 1961. In 1963 Sam Reed became leader of the house band, which was well known amongst artists in the chitlin circuit. According to The Philadelphia Inquirer, by 1971 the shows were grossing $250,000 a year. During the rest of the month when performers were not in town, movies usually played. There were also jazz shows where local and famous jazz performers took the stage. The shows were not characterized by the rowdy crowds that accompanied the shows promoted by Georgie Woods.

The Uptown Theater was also famous for its amateur nights in which local artists would compete for various prizes. Many artists got their start in the music industry due to these amateur nights. One such person that started their career at the Uptown Theater was Daryl Hall of Hall & Oates. Hall, who attended the nearby Temple University, won a talent show playing with his then group, the Temptones. This was before pairing up with Oates. The group, backed by the James Brown Band, won the contest thus getting Hall his first record deal.

Civil rights
The theater was a hotbed for civil rights activism, especially in the form of music. Georgie Woods produced shows at the theater, called freedom shows, in which artists played to promote civil rights, and the money generated at these shows went to charities of Georgie Woods' choice, regardless of creed, color or religion. In 1967, Georgie Woods staged a special show for wounded veterans from the Vietnam War that were from the Philadelphia area.
The theater also became an important landmark for civil rights in Philadelphia. Cecil Moore was a Philadelphia lawyer that was extremely involved in civil rights, and was a close friend of Georgie Woods, and was also involved in the freedom shows.

In 1963, Georgie Woods, Jackie Wilson, and Del Shields won awards at the Uptown Theater from the Philadelphia branch of the NAACP for being entertainers that were actively involved in civil rights. Also, the famous 1964 Philadelphia race riot happened blocks from the theater, and when it occurred Commissioner Howard R. Leary had Georgie Woods come talk to and calm down the crowd, which eventually dispersed as per his request. His influence on the community was so great, showed how important the Uptown Theater was for the residents of North Philadelphia.

Neighborhood

By the late 1950s, North Philadelphia was the epicenter of Philadelphia's African-American community. It was a vibrant place populated by all classes. There were dozens of factories, numerous clubs along Columbia Avenue, shops and restaurants all over the place, and the Uptown—which evolved into a mecca for live music. Many family owned businesses around the theater became popular spots for the performers and audience members alike. Many of the performers would eat at Miss Pearl's house, which was located right behind the venue on Carlisle Street.

In addition to that, many of them got their hair done at Don's Doo Shop, which was and still owned by Don Williams, right around the corner on 15th Street and Susquehanna Avenue. Many of the artists stayed at the Ben Motor Inn on 22nd Street and Spring Garden. The neighborhood was often noted to be tight-knit, where many people living in the area worked in the nearby factories and knew each other by name. The area surrounding the theater was also unique in that it did not provide a lot of space for parking, so many people walked or took public transportation to the Uptown.

Later years and decline
Eventually, the riots and the manufacturing exodus of the 1960s occurred, and the gang wars of the 1970s. By 1978, the Uptown was too small for the major acts, in an area with high crime. In 1971, Sam Reed, who was leader of the house band in the 1960s stepped down. In December 1971, there were frequent concert gang fights that broke out. In 1972, Georgie Woods stopped producing shows at the Uptown Theater, mainly because of the drugs and violence in the surrounding neighborhood of the theater. In May 1972, shows stopped playing at all at the venue, and in 1978 the Uptown Theater ultimately closed.

Other reasons led to the decline of theaters similar to the venue. The music industry had changed significantly from when the theater was in its prime. Black artists were now able to cross over, and play in venues such as ones in Atlantic City and Las Vegas. Musicians that played there were able to perform at larger venues and make more profit. Georgie Woods also stated in an interview that the existence of booking agencies made it harder to book acts because they would ask for more money.

There was a point in time when black artists could only be heard if they went to Georgie Woods, but once music became integrated. Also, the decline of independent record stores disabled local artists from being able to promote their music. On the other hand, music became more integrated, so many radio stations only played a sampling of rhythm and blues, as opposed to stations that used to solely play rhythm and blues. Many artists started to cross over into pop, so they were less inclined to play at theaters such as the Uptown.

The neighborhood also changed dramatically. Many of the businesses started to decline because they catered to the Uptown clientele and lost them once the theater closed.

The Uptown briefly reopened in the 1980s as a church. A church group held services there until a 1991 storm damaged the roof, allowing water to pucker the painted walls and corrode the gilded auditorium. After the congregation left, the only people who entered were thieves, crackheads and taggers More recently, members of the community gathered at the Uptown to mourn the death of Michael Jackson.

Uptown Entertainment and Development Corporation (UEDC)
The Uptown Entertainment and Development Corporation (UEDC) is a Community Development Corporation that was incorporated as a nonprofit in 1995. It acquired the theater building in 2001.  Fund raising and renovation work were ongoing in 2018 and a 2020 re-opening was anticipated.  However the work stalled due to Covid-19 shutdowns and an attrition of board leadership. In February 2022 the UEDC had new leadership and was restarting the renovation work. The group declined to anticipte a new opening date after having missed that goal in the past.

References

Theatres on the National Register of Historic Places in Philadelphia
Theatres completed in 1927
Theatres in Philadelphia
African-American theatre
African-American cultural history
Art Deco architecture in Pennsylvania
Templetown, Philadelphia
Historically African-American theaters and music venues